{{Infobox academic
| honorific_prefix   = 
| name               = Geerhardus Johannes Vos 
| honorific_suffix   = 
| image              = Geerhardus Johannes Vos (1862–1949).jpg
| image_size         = 
| alt                = 
| caption            = 
| native_name        = 
| native_name_lang   = 
| birth_name         = 
| birth_date         = 
| birth_place        = Heerenveen, Friesland, Netherlands
| death_date         = 
| death_place        = Grand Rapids, Michigan
| death_cause        = 
| region             = 
| nationality        = 
| citizenship        = 
| residence          = 
| other_names        = 
| occupation         = 
| period             = 
| known_for          = Biblical Theology, Calvinist theologian
| home_town          = 
| title              = Professor of Biblical Theology at Princeton
| boards             = 
| spouse             = Catherine Smith
| children           = Johannes, Bernardus, Geerhardus Jr., Marianne (Radius)
| parents            =
| relatives          =
| awards             = 
| website            = 
| education          = 
| alma_mater         = Calvin Theological Seminary
Princeton Theological Seminary
Strassburg University
| thesis_title       = Die Kampfe und Streitigkeiten zwischen den banu umajja und den benu hasim
| thesis_url         = 
| thesis_year        = 1888
| school_tradition   = Reformed Biblical Theology
| doctoral_advisor   = 
| academic_advisors  = 
| influences         = 
| era                = 
| discipline         = 
| sub_discipline     = Reformed, Biblical Theology
| workplaces         = Calvin Theological Seminary, Princeton Theological Seminary
| doctoral_students  = 
| notable_students   = 
| main_interests     = 
| notable_works      = 
| notable_ideas      = 
| influenced         = 
| signature          = 
| signature_alt      = 
| signature_size     = 
| footnotes          = See title.
}}Geerhardus Johannes Vos (March 14, 1862 – August 13, 1949) was a Dutch-American Calvinist theologian and one of the most distinguished representatives of the Princeton Theology. He is sometimes called the father of Reformed Biblical Theology.

Biography

Vos was born to a Dutch Reformed pastor in Heerenveen in Friesland in the Netherlands. In 1881, when Geerhardus was 19 years old, his father, Jan Vos, accepted a call to be the pastor of a Christian Reformed Church congregation in Grand Rapids, Michigan.

Education in Europe and America

In September, 1881, Geerhardus Vos began his higher education at the Christian Reformed Church's Theological School, which is today's Calvin University and Calvin Theological Seminary in Grand Rapids, and his exceptional talents were soon recognized by the school, for he earned his bachelor's degree in a single year. During this period, Vos was appointed by the Curatorium to be the instructional assistant of Gerrit Egbert Boer, the teacher of the school as well as the president of the assembly. During the second year, Vos was paid as a lecturer alongside his studies. 

In 1883, Vos was enrolled at Princeton Theological Seminary, and he had already mastered German, Dutch, Latin, French, English, Greek and Hebrew by that time. Upon his request, he entered Princeton as a second year student. His senior paper, titled "The Mosaic Origin of the Pentateuchal Codes," was awarded the Hebrew fellowship prize.

Vos carried on further studies at the University of Berlin in Germany in 1886. In April, he received Abraham Kuyper's invitation to teach in the Free University of Amsterdam as Professor of Old Testament, however he turned that down partly because of his father's objection. Almost at the same period, the Christian Reformed Church nominated him as a professor in Grand Rapids. Herman Bavinck also arrived at Berlin to meet Vos at the end of July, 1886, and encouraged Vos to study in the Kaiser Wilhelm University of Strassburg when Vos was considering transferring to a new school. Vos received his doctorate in Arabic Studies from the Philosophy Faculty of Strassburg University in 1888.

Career period
Herman Bavinck and Abraham Kuyper tried to convince Vos to become Professor of Old Testament Theology at the Free University in Amsterdam, but Vos chose to return to America. Thus, in the Fall of 1888, Vos took up a position at Theological School at Grand Rapids' faculty. He was installed as Professor of Didactic and Exegetical Theology at the Spring Street Christian Reformed Church in Grand Rapids on September 4, 1888. In his dogmatics lectures, he did not use the common textbook materials from Francis Turretin, John Calvin, or Charles Hodge, but developed his original work, Reformed Dogmatics which was published in 1896 in handwritten format. Vos' five volume Reformed Dogmatics were translated from Dutch to English by Richard B. Gaffin Jr. and others. The first volume was published in 2013 and the fifth volume was published in 2016.

In 1892, Vos moved and joined the faculty of the Princeton Theological Seminary, where he became its first Professor of Biblical Theology. At Princeton, he taught alongside J. Gresham Machen and B. B. Warfield and authored his most famous works, including Pauline Eschatology (1930) and Biblical Theology: Old and New Testaments (1948). Despite his opposition to the growing modernist influence at Princeton in the late 1920s, he decided to remain at Princeton Seminary after Machen left to form Westminster Theological Seminary, as he was close to retirement. Vos retired to California in 1932, three years after the formation of Westminster. 

In 1894, Vos married Catherine Smith.  Known for being the author of The Children's Story Bible, she died in 1937.  They had three sons and one daughter. One of their sons, Johannes G. Vos (1903-1983), studied at Princeton Theological Seminary and became ordained in the Reformed Presbyterian Church of North America, and was also a professor at Geneva College in Pennsylvania.

After retirement
After retirement from Princeton, Vos remained in the Presbyterian Church (USA), whereas his wife (Catherine) and their two sons, Geerhardus Jr. and Johannes together with Johannes' wife, Marian, joined the Reformed Presbyterian Church of North America. His daughter, Marianne, joined the Christian Reformed Church in North America with her husband, William Radius. Bernardus Vos joined Gresham Machen's newly formed church, which was later renamed as the Orthodox Presbyterian Church in 1939.

On August 13, 1949, Vos passed away in Hessel Convalescent Hospital in Grand Rapids, Michigan. A funeral service was conducted by H. Henry Meeter in Zaagman Chapel in Calvin College two days later. Vos' body was then buried in the tiny village of Roaring Branch, Pennsylvania on Wednesday, August 17, 1949. For his burial, very few people turned out. Only two family members, Bernardus and Geerhardus Jr., a man and a woman from the local Methodist Church, and two ministers from the Orthodox Presbyterian Church, John De Waard and Cornelius Van Til were present. Van Til preached from 2 Corinthians 5:1 at the burial service. No one was there from his denomination and from the institution he had served for nearly 40 years.

Works
Books

 Published posthumously'''

Journal articles

References

Further reading

External links

 

1862 births
1949 deaths
People from Heerenveen
Dutch emigrants to the United States
American people of Frisian descent
Orthodox Presbyterian Church members
American Calvinist and Reformed theologians
Supralapsarians
19th-century American writers
20th-century American non-fiction writers
19th-century Calvinist and Reformed theologians
20th-century Calvinist and Reformed theologians
Princeton Theological Seminary alumni
Princeton Theological Seminary faculty